Bihdia is a village in Kamrup rural district, in the state of Assam, India, situated in south bank of river Brahmaputra.

Transport
The village is located north of National Highway 31 and connected to nearby towns and cities like Chaygaon, Boko and Guwahati with regular buses and other modes of transportation. This place has a regular transport system and one can travel here easily.

See also
 Birpara
 Bhomolahati

References

Villages in Kamrup district